Crephelochares abnormalis, is a species of water scavenger beetle found in Cambodia, Sri Lanka, Taiwan, Thailand, Vietnam,  Ryukyu Islands and Indonesia: Borneo, Java, Sulawesi, Sumatra.

Taxonomy 
The species was originally described by David Sharp in 1890 under the genus Philydrus.

It was transferred to the genus Chasmogenus when Chasmogenus was considered a subgenus of the genus Helochares and a synonym of Crephelochares. Additional details about the taxonomic history of Chasmogenus and Crephelochares can be found in Girón and Short (2021).

Description
The species is closely related to Chasmogenus orbus, only can be separated by features of the aedeagus: parameres without or with small subapical tooth, where the apex is broadened inwards. Median lobe gradually becomes narrow from apical quarter to apex and widely truncate apically.

References 

Hydrophilidae
Insects of Sri Lanka
Insects described in 1890